Daniel Spellbound is a Canadian computer animated streaming television series created by Matt Fernandes of Industrial Brothers. Co-produced by Netflix Animation, Industrial Brothers and Boat Rocker Studios, the series premiered on October 27, 2022, on Netflix.

Characters

Main characters 
 Daniel Spellbound (voiced by Alex Barima) - is a Afro-Latino orphan teenage tracker of the magic world hidden from humans. His job is to find ingredients for magicians. In season 2 he's no longer a tracker due to breaking the tracker code so he has to find an untraceable item to regain being a tracker again. In The Tickle Pit, Jayce manages to help Daniel by presenting the other trackers an untrackable item and now he is back to being a tracker, but quits at the end of the season, joining Lucy on her quest to seal Dread Magic.
 Hoagie (voiced by Deven Mack) - is a human-turned-pig being who can sniff out magic and is one of Daniel's friends.
 Lucy Santana (voiced by Chantel Riley) - is a African-American dowser magician who works for the Bureau of Magical Enforcement and is one of Daniel’s friends. At the end of the first season, Lucy becomes the new head of the BoME. In Season 2, she can be the new Primus if she can find the Scepter of The Primus.
 Shakila "Shak" Chinda (voiced by Saara Chaudry) a tracker and the sister of Jayce Chinda.
 Jayce Chinda (voiced by Al Mukadam) a legendary tracker who got turned into a demon when he was corrupted by dread magic. His intendsion is to find the coffer of the spellbounds and unleash dread magic and corrupt the world.

Supporting characters 
 Viktor Albright (voiced by Philip Craig) - the factor of Albright Worldwide and an alchemist who appears to be an old friend of Daniel's father, Duncan Spellbound. At the end of the first season, he was killed by Camilla.
 Tyson (voiced by Dwayne Hill) a hotdog vender who is one of Daniel's customers.
 Hector (voiced by Sean Rey) a spider centaur.
 Burden (voiced by Rainbow Sun Francks) both a tracker and wizard.
 Bixby Prospero (voiced by Lynn Rafferty) a half-goblin tracker.
 Nurenya (voiced by Ellen Dublin) a mermaid queen.
 Spanos (voiced by Joe Pingue) a weapon forger and the brother of Nurenya.
 Haruspex (voiced by Nadine Roden) an oracle who knows anything.
 Elyse (voiced by Julie Sype) a dowser and a rival of Lucy, she intends to be the new primus.

Villains 
 Camilla Thomas / Dark Mage (voiced by Kyra Harper) the former head of the Bureau of Magical Enforcement. Her goal was to control all the magic.
 The Pie Maker (voiced by Catherine Disher) an evil diminutive witch whom Daniel knew to be the most wicked in all of New York. She owns a pie bakery and masquerades herself as a harmless old lady.
 Kel (voiced by Paul Amos) the owner of Mystic Outpost who sells weapons and magical objects to buyers.

Episodes

Season 1 (2022)

Season 2 (2023)

Production
In early February 2021, Daniel Spellbound was announced by Netflix. The series' production is handled by Industrial Brothers and Boat Rocker Studios, whilst the latter's parent company Boat Rocker Media is in charge of global merchandising distribution.

The first season has ten 22-minute episodes.

The second season premiered on January 26, 2023.

References

External links

2020s American animated television series
2020s American children's television series
2022 American television series debuts
2020s Canadian animated television series
2020s Canadian children's television series
2022 Canadian television series debuts
American children's animated adventure television series
American children's animated fantasy television series
American computer-animated television series
Canadian children's animated adventure television series
Canadian children's animated fantasy television series
Canadian computer-animated television series
English-language Netflix original programming
Netflix children's programming
Teen animated television series
Television series by Netflix Animation
Television series by Boat Rocker Media
Television shows set in New York City